The United States – Azerbaijan Chamber of Commerce (USACC) is a not-for-profit lobbying group aiming to develop long-term business ties between the firms in the United States and Azerbaijan and attract US investment to Azerbaijan.

Mission 
The mission of the USACC is to facilitate and encourage investment and trade between US and Azerbaijan; provide a medium for interaction for NGOs, business firms and think tanks from these countries; assist and promote commercial objectives of businesses investing in Azerbaijan; promote Azerbaijan's potential; sponsor educational programs, trade missions, seminars, conferences and publications; enhance understanding between the two nations by establishing and developing cultural links.
In September 2000, USACC founded Azerbaijan Trade and Cultural Center (ATCC) to stimulate intercultural ties between United States and Azerbaijan.

Many businesses, including ones from Fortune 500 Companies are members of USACC. USACC has been the driving force behind world's longest oil pipeline, Baku-Tbilisi-Ceyhan and Baku-Tbilisi-Erzurum gas pipeline, operational today.
The chamber actively promoted commercial links in agriculture, construction, information technology, alternative energy and tourism.

Leadership 
The Chamber is chaired by T. Don Stacy, co-chaired by James A. Baker, IV (Baker Botts, LLP) and Reza Vaziri (R.V. Investment Group).

Honorary Council of Advisors include former Secretary of State James Baker III, former National Security Advisor to U.S. President Zbigniew Brzezinski, former Secretary of State and Assistant to U.S President on National Security Affairs Henry Kissinger, former Assistant to U.S. President on National Security Affairs Brent Scowcroft, former Chief of Staff to the U.S. President, John Sununu.

Board of directors 

 Shapoor Ansari, MD,
 Halim Ates, CEO, Telia Sonera
 Farhad Azima, Chairman and CEO, Aviation Leasing Group
 Scott Blacklin, Vice President, Cisco Systems
 Betty Blair, Editor, Azerbaijan International
 Jahangir Hajiyev, Chairman, International Bank of Azerbaijan
 Albert Marchetti, Vice President, Hess Corporation
 Greg Saunders, Director, International Affairs, BP
 Diana L. Sedney, Manager, International Government Relations, Chevron
 Michael White, Azerbaijan Country Manager, ExxonMobil
 Gregory K. Williams, Strategic Security Manager, Coca-Cola Bottling Co.
 Ali Agan, CEO, Azercell Telekom
 Ian M. Davis, Vice President, Occidental Petroleum Corporation
 Robert Moran, Vice President, Halliburton

Former directors include former Vice President of the United States, Dick Cheney and former Deputy Secretary of State, Richard Armitage.

References

External links 
USACC Official Website

Azerbaijani-American culture
Chambers of commerce in the United States
Organizations established in 1995
Political advocacy groups in the United States